Nangli Saledi Singh is a village in Shekhawati, Jhunjhunu in Rajasthan. It is a well developed hub for agriculture and education with a modern market to cater all the day-to-day needs.
It is the midpoint of five villages named ked,chanana, badau, bilwa (khetri), jasrapur.
It has the market that can fulfill all necessary needs of customers.

References

 

Villages in Jaipur district